Jordan Blair Daydora Jarvis (born 17 April 1998) is a Hong Kong-born Filipino professional footballer who currently plays as a centre back for Hong Kong Premier League club Tai Po. He is also a former Philippines youth international.

Early life
Jarvis was born in Sai Ying Pun, Hong Kong to an English father and a Filipina mother. He studied in YMCA of Hong Kong Christian College for his secondary school life. His father Mark Jarvis was the owner of Philippine Premier League club United Makati.

Career

Youth
Jarvis is a former youth player of Hong Kong Premier League club Pegasus.

Collegiate career
Jarvis played for the football team of his college, the Ateneo Blue Eagles.

Davao Aguilas
After playing one season with Ateneo in the UAAP, Jarvis joined Philippines Football League club Davao Aguilas.

Global Cebu
In 2018, in the second season of the PFL, he joined Global Cebu. The club was previously owned by Philippines manager Dan Palami, but after 18 years of owning the club, he sold it to Jarvis' father, Mark Jarvis, who promptly signed his son.

Eastern
In 2019, after playing two seasons as a professional footballer, Jarvis returned to his country of birth, signing for Hong Kong Premier League club Eastern.

United City
In August 2020, he was signed by United City F.C. for the 2020 PFL season.

Tai Po
Jarvis returned to the Hong Kong Premier League on 28 January 2023, signing for Tai Po.

International career
Jarvis was born in Sai Ying Pun, Hong Kong to an English father and a Filipina mother which made him eligible to play for England, Philippines and Hong Kong.

Philippines youth
In 2015, Jarvis played for the Philippines U-19 team at the 2016 AFC U-19 Championship qualifiers.

Jarvis was called up for the Philippines U-23 team in 2017, ahead of the 2018 AFC U-23 Championship qualifiers against Japan, China, and Cambodia.

Philippines
Jarvis was called up for the Philippines senior team in October 2018 for the Bangabandhu Cup. He did not play a game, so remains uncapped for his country.

References

External links
 Jordan Jarvis at HKFA
 
 
 

1998 births
Living people
Citizens of the Philippines through descent
University Athletic Association of the Philippines footballers
Filipino footballers
Association football midfielders
Association football defenders
Competitors at the 2017 Southeast Asian Games
Ateneo de Manila University alumni
Filipino people of English descent
Eastern Sports Club footballers
Resources Capital FC players
Global Makati F.C. players
Tai Po FC players
Hong Kong Premier League players
Hong Kong First Division League players
Competitors at the 2019 Southeast Asian Games
Southeast Asian Games competitors for the Philippines